Kerem Can Akyüz (born 1 July 1989) is a Turkish footballer who plays for TFF Third League club Nevşehir Belediyespor.

References

External links
 
 

1989 births
People from Fatih
Footballers from Istanbul
Living people
Turkish footballers
Association football defenders
Association football midfielders
Karşıyaka S.K. footballers
Mardinspor footballers
Türk Telekom G.S.K. footballers
1922 Konyaspor footballers
Adana Demirspor footballers
Balıkesirspor footballers
Alanyaspor footballers
Denizlispor footballers
Bursaspor footballers
Samsunspor footballers
Gençlerbirliği S.K. footballers
Kocaelispor footballers
Süper Lig players
TFF First League players
TFF Second League players
TFF Third League players